Shuowen Jiezi is the title of an educational television series broadcast daily on China's Sun TV channel and presented by Zhuang Jing (庄婧). The title is taken from the ancient Chinese etymological dictionary Shuowen Jiezi, and each episode briefly explains a Chinese character.

For scheduling purposes the series is also given an English title, Hanzi Tracing, but this is not a translation of the Chinese title.  There is no English in the programs themselves.

Broadcast times

The program is 5 minutes in length and a new episode is broadcast each day.  The day's episode is repeated up to 4 times during the next 24 hours.  As of December 2010, the usual broadcast times were 04:07, 11:18, 16:53 and 19:55 UTC+08:00 (= 03:18, 08:53, 11:55 and 20:07 UTC) but these do vary.

A selection of some of the previous episodes is also available to view on the program's Web archive.

Opening and closing lines
Zhuang Jing starts each episode with a couplet followed by an introduction ( where X is the sound of the character about to be discussed).  The episode usually ends with a variant of a standard closing.

External links
 Series home page with archive of characters explained

References

Chinese television shows